Ras El Bar, which translates to "head of land", is a resort city in the Governorate of Damietta,  Egypt. It is located on the Mediterranean Sea at the mouth of the Damietta Nile branch.   There are approximately 25,000 permanent residents in the city. However, during the summer peak holiday season, from July to September, the population quickly expands to over 250,000.

Geography

Location 
Ras El Bar lies in a peninsula on the coast of the Mediterranean Sea, and it is bordered on the western by the Damietta Nile branch. The area of "Lessan" is located in the extreme northern part of this peninsula, and it is at this point where the Damietta Nile arm flows in the Mediterranean sea, which gives Ras El Bar the shape of a triangle.

Climate 
The climate of Ras El Bar  is classified as hot desert (BWh) by Köppen-Geiger system although tempered by the proximity to the Mediterranean Sea.

Geomorphology 
While Ras El Bar is within the Nile Delta, its sandy soils are due to predominant coastal processes with much of the city lying on the foreshore dune structures. Older portions of the city are in the natural levee of the Damietta river.

Animals and Plants 
 Many dolphins visit Ras El Bar shores
 Many kinds of wild birds actually live in the Manzala lake
 In the fall season, many of the immigrating flocks of European birds pass by Ras El Bar in their course to South Africa

Infrastructure

Houses 
The land renting system started back since 1898, then started building houses and villas that were named "e'sha" (hut). In 1902, the first civic plan for the town was implemented. The plan established that the streets would be straight block style to maintain the town's beauty. At the very beginning those huts were built of wood and other simple materials, had only one floor and hosted only one family. These were temporary structures built at the start of the summer and removed at its end. Eventually, newer permanent villas replaced these using cement and bricks. Now, single blocks may have twelve units with most of them with garages. They are still named "e'sha" (hut) among locals.

Roads 
The main road in Ras El Bar is called "Port Said road". Most of the streets are dirt roads and are numbered. The street numbers start from "El Moderiya Street". Streets north of it have even numbers while streets south of it have odd numbers.
 Port Said Street: is the main access in Ras El-Bar and it connects its entrance to the beginning of "Lesan".
 Nile Street: primary commercial street running parallel to the river.

External:
 Older roads that link Ras El-Bar with other governorates are available all year long.

Sports 
 There are many kinds of sports like beach sports; swimming competitions which involve crossing the nile from Damietta to Ras El Bar.
 Many clubs and gyms for sports like football, volleyball, handball, Kung Fu, karate, judo, etc.

Education 
Ras El Bar as a summer resort has a small number of permanent residents, therefore there are few schools and universities.

Economy 
Since early ages, Ras El Bar has been a main port for all kinds of goods that pass through the Nile and/or come from the sea.

Oil and gas exploration
There has been gas and oil exploration going on in Ras El Bar for a number of years.

Fishing 
Ras El Bar is a huge centre for fishing boats that leave into the Mediterranean sea and return loaded with different kinds of fish that helped in enriching this industry all over the country. It is also a spot for manufacturing ships of all kinds and sizes, especially fishing ones.

History

Pharaohs 
Ras El Bar has been called many names since the Pharaohs. Pharaohs called it the Mediterranean Sea (the great green sea), then came the Romans and called it "The Romans Sea" on 30 AD, and the spot where sea could meet a river was called (Be Tamosh) and it meant the place between two waves or two seas. The name itself Ras El Bar came from some sailors who felt that this place can be the shelter from the sea's dangers. "Ras" is the start and "El Bar" is the land so it is the start of land and the shelter of any sailor.

Greek and Roman eras 
Damietta was known as "Tamiats" during the Greek and Roman eras, and it was known as "Tamiat" during the time of Veterans Copts.

Islamic era 
According to the Historical Documents, "Tamiats" was an important Coptic Bishopric during the Fifth Century. The name "Demt", which means "the ability" in the Syriac Language, was also mentioned in a verse sent to the prophet "Idris" or "Herms". The sense behind the name is the ability that combined the fresh water and the brine water together in that place.

After the revealing of the Quran and before the Islamic conquest of Egypt, it was mentioned that Omar Ibn Al-Khattab recalled the Islamic prophet Muhammad's words as follows "Omar, you will open two ports in Egypt, Alexandria and Damietta. About Alexandria, it was destroyed by barbarians. About Damietta, its people are martyrs. This who does this for a night will be with me along with the other Prophets at Al Kuds".

According to Anas ibn Malik, who was one of Muhammad's companions, Muhammad said "Muslims will open a port that is considered the "ability" place, in which the olds of my 'Ummah' will live; a one night in this place is better than a thousand months worship; it is the "ability" place for those who sacrifice their souls for God." Then, Anas said "and what is that "ability" place, Prophet?" Muhammad said "It is the place that is spelled with D, M, and T."

Damietta is called Caphtor by several ancient manuscripts including the Bible, Koran, Josephues, and Egyptian texts. The Torah may use the spelling "Kaftor". Being mentioned and described in the three Holy Heavenly religions is a great pride that Damietta has out of many beautiful places

Crusades 

Damietta' position on the west bank of the Nile river is a strategic location that urged many enemies' fleets to conquer the city, and that also urged its people to build a number of fortifying castles and towers to protect the city.

In 1218, The Crusaders started to approach Damietta, and they made a dike surrounded by a bailey to protect them, and they settled there where they initiated their assaults against the strong resistance from the Dumyaty people. The resistance stilled strong for four months, but the Crusaders condensed their attacks and they surrounded the whole city abandoning it and its people from any coming support. However, the Dumyaty people stand strong and kept resisting till the summer season came, and the flood filled the Nile river with water till the baileys were destroyed, and the dike became like an island surrounded with water. After that, the Crusaders were seeking a conciliating treaty to get out of the city and the whole country. After thirty years, the Crusaders came back to conquer Egypt as a starting point for invading Palestine and the other Arab countries.

In 1248, the king of France at that time, Louis IX, sailed from southern France with a great fleet until he reached Damietta's beaches. At that time, the Prince Fakhr El Din left the city with no army and ran away. However, the Dumyaty people resisted that fleet. They burnt their shops and everything that the enemy could make use of, and they retreated to the jungles and the inner places in the city to inveigle the enemy. Then, they started their enchorial stood out and they beaten the French in a number of battles. The last battle was at Faraskour, which is a city on the Nile River, where Dumyaty people killed a number of ten thousand men from the French, and they captivated the others along with the king Louis IX, and they imprisoned him. Later on, King Louis IX paid four thousand Egyptian Pounds to be released along with his men, and he left the Damietta on May 8, 1250, and that date became the National Day of Damietta later on.

The battle was known as Mansoura battle it took place at the recent mansoura city on the Nile river and the king of France at that time was imprisoned at Dar Ibn Lokman.

Modern era 
Damietta started to create a new path towards peace and safe life after struggling against invaders. The new path is representing its natural rule that it was created for, which is tourism.

Ras el-Bar is noted as the destination of the celebrated Druze Princess, songstress and film actress Asmahaan (real name, Amaal al-Atrash, q.v.), still revered by many as the greatest Arabic-music singer ever, when she was killed in a car crash in nearby Mansoura, Egypt in July 1944.  The two-door car in which she was being chauffeured in the back seat with a female companion went out of control and crashed into a roadside canal there, drowning her and the companion, though the driver managed to escape, giving rise to multiple conspiracy theories as to the cause of the fatality, based on antagonism towards Asmahaan on the part of both the British and Germans during WWII, on the part of Egyptians, Druze and her own family members, including her ex-husband, because of her behavior that they saw as scandalous and dishonorable, and on the part of her great rival the singer Umm Kulthum out of jealousy, all which theories are mere speculation, as no evidence of any of them has ever been found.

Recently, an alleyway by the side of the Nile River was made at the city of Ras El Bar. The other side of the alleyway contains a number of shops and restaurants till it reaches the area of "El Lesan". "El Lesan" is the place where the Mediterranean Sea meets the Nile River, and it was also developed to compete with worldwide tourist places.

See also
 List of World War II North Africa Airfields LG-238

References

External links
 Damietta Governorate
 Ras El Bar Fans Facebook Page

Populated places in Damietta Governorate